Mark Bowen may refer to:

 Mark Bowen (footballer) (born 1963), Welsh footballer and coach 
 Mark Bowen (writer), American writer
 Mark Bowen (cricketer) (born 1967), English cricketer
Mark Bowen, 5th Baronet (1958–2014) of the Bowen baronets
MV Mark Bowen, British dredger
Mark Bowen, lead guitarist of IDLES

See also
Bowen (surname)